Clénet was a manufacturer of Neoclassic automobiles with old retro styling, mixed with modern technology. Each limited-production model was conceived, designed, and produced by a small team in Santa Barbara County, California, in the 1970s and 1980s. The automobile's distinctive styling was based on the high-end automobiles of the 1930s. Despite their retro looks, Clénets used modern drive trains and suspension systems.

Founding

Clénet Coachworks, Inc., was formed by Alain Clénet and investors in 1975. Originally started in a garage, the company was moved into an airplane hangar where an assembly line style of production was begun, later to be reborn in a "high tech" facility in Goleta, California, where production of Series II continued until the company ran into financial difficulties in 1980, ceased production, and Alain Clénet filed for bankruptcy. The remaining bodies, tooling and equipment went up for auction. Soon after the bankruptcy, Alfred J. DiMora owner of Classic Clenet Club and one of the first employee of Clenet, purchased off the assets of Clénet Coachworks, Inc.

Clénet's first car was called the Series I. It was a roadster designed in a 1930s style. This was then replaced by the heavier-looking Series II in 1979.

A total of 250 factory-authorized Clénet Series I, 187 Series II, 65 Series III, and 15 Series IV cars were produced by Clenet Coachworks, Inc. Clénets sold for around US$105,000 in the 1970s. Recently Clénets in excellent or new condition with no mileage have sold for US$100,000 to $150,000.

Repurchase
Alfred J. DiMora purchased the assets of Clénet Coachworks, Inc., revived Clénet and moved the company to a new production factory in Carpinteria, California. He re-established the production of the automobile to the same standards of the original, employing many of the original craftsmen from the first Clénet company. Production resumed the two series of Clénets started at the Goleta facility. Later the Series IV and Series V Designed by Alfred J. DiMora were added to the line of Clénet automobiles. Clénet Coachworks automobiles offered such features as Italian walnut burl dashboards and etched glass accented by Waterford crystal ashtrays which brought many Clénet models in at over $100,000. Buyers included Farrah Fawcett, Rod Stewart, Ken Norton, Sylvester Stallone and King Hussein of Jordan. Clénets were called "Driven Art" by Automotive Age and the "American Rolls-Royce" by Fortune.

Honors
DiMora's Clénet was selected as the "Official Centennial Car" in 1986, when President Ronald Reagan declared the Centennial Year of the Gasoline-Powered Automobile that it resulted in honors for both DiMora and the Clénet at the Automotive Hall of Fame in Michigan.

In popular culture
Clénet appeared in media during the 1980s as a symbol of wealth and sophistication. In Blake Edward's 1981 film S.O.B., Robert Vaughn's character David Blackman drove a Clénet. Spoiled young heiress Fallon Carrington drove a Clénet during the first two seasons of soap opera Dynasty in 1981–1982. A vehicle was featured in the 1983 music video for the Public Image Ltd's "This Is Not a Love Song".

Buyers of Clénet automobiles include entertainer Julio Iglesias, producer Dan Enright, producer Aaron Spelling, actress Farrah Fawcett, entertainer Rod Stewart, boxer Ken Norton, entertainer Sylvester Stallone, entertainer Wayne Newton, Vince McMahon, and King Hussein of Jordan.

References

External links
 [http://www.clenetcoachworks.com
 Clenet Club
 

Defunct motor vehicle manufacturers of the United States
Vehicle manufacturing companies established in 1975
Motor vehicle manufacturers based in California
Vehicle manufacturing companies disestablished in 1980
1975 establishments in California
1980 disestablishments in California
Retro-style automobiles